Below is a partial list of shows that were previously aired on the Philippine television network, GMA Network. For the currently aired shows of the network, see the list of programs broadcast by GMA Network.

Original programming

News

Drama
Anthology

Series

Variety

Comedy

Talk

Reality

Talent based

Game

Documentary / magazine

Travelogue

Public affairs

Informative

Religious

Film and special presentation

 Aliwan sa GMA
 Cinemax
 Early, Early Movies
 Early Viva Movies
 Friday Night Movie
 GMA Motion Pictures
 GMA Presents
 GMA Sinehan
 GMA Special, Specials
 GMA Sunday Specials
 Late Nite Action
 Marvelous Golden Movies
 Midnight Horror Stories
 Midnight Theater
 Mighty Good Movies, Too
 Our Wednesday Special
 Primetime Tuesday
 Romance Theatre
 Saturday Powerhouse Specials
 Sine Espesyal
 Sinemax
 Sineng Pinoy
 Sunday Limited Engagement
 Sunday Night Movie
 Sunday Night Special
 Tanghalan
 Teenage Suicide
 The Best of Late Night Specials
 Tuesday Specials, Specials
 Tuesday Super Specials
 Viva Box Office Hits
 Wide Awake Movies
 Your Favorite Movie

Others

Regional programming
Note: Titles are listed in alphabetical order followed by the year of debut in parentheses.
 24 Oras Amianan 
 24 Oras Bikol 
 24 Oras Central Visayas 
 24 Oras Davao 
 24 Oras Ilokano 
 24 Oras North Central Luzon 
 24 Oras Northern Mindanao 
 24 Oras Southern Mindanao 
 24 Oras Western Visayas 
 The Amianan Agenda 
 Araguy
 Arangkada 
 Balitang Ilokano 
 Baretang Bikol 
 Bongga! 
 Buena Mano Balita 
 Coffee with Us 
 Eat Na Ta! - GMA 7 Cebu 
 GMA Musicale - GMA 7 Cebu
 GMA News Cebu
 Ha! Ha! Hayop - GMA 10 Dagupan
 The Ilonggo Agenda 
 Ikaw ug Ako 
 Istayl Naton
 Isyu Ngayon 
 * Isyu Ngayon North Central Luzon
 * Isyu Ngonian Bicolandia
 * Isyu Subong Ilonggo
 * Isyu Subong Negrense
 * Isyu Karon Central Visayas
 * Isyu Karon Northern Mindanao
 * Isyu Karon Soccsksargen
 * Isyu Karon Southern Mindanao
 * Isyu Mindanao
 Isyu ug Istorya 
 Kuyaw! 
 Let's Fiesta 
 Mga Balita sa Kilum-Kilum 
 The Mindanao Agenda 
 News at Seven Cebu 
 News at Seven Davao 
 GMA News Digest Cebu
 Oi!
 OMG! featuring Caramba - GMA 10 Dagupan
 People, Events and Places
 PNB Newscast Zamboanga 
 Primera Balita 
 Ratsada 
 Ratsada 24 Oras 
 Singgit Davao
 Testigo 
 Testigo Northern Mindanao 
 Una Ka BAI 
 The Visayan Agenda 
 Visita Iglesia

Acquired programming
Note: Titles are listed in alphabetical order followed by the year of debut in parentheses.

News
 Hard Copy
 NBC Nightly News

Drama

American
 21 Jump Street 
 77 Sunset Strip 
 240-Robert
 The A-Team 
 Aaron's Way
 Alien Nation
 The All New Mission Impossible
 Batman
 Beauty and the Beast 
 Ben Casey 
 Benji, Zax & the Alien Prince 
 Bourbon Street Beat
 Broken Arrow
 Bronco
 Buck James
 Cade's County 
 Cagney & Lacey
 Chase
 Charlie's Angels 
 Chicago Story
 China Beach
 CHiPS
 Cimarron City
 The Colbys
 Colt .45
 Combat!
 Coronado 9
 Crossbow
 Daktari
 Dallas
 Daniel Boone
 Days of Our Lives
 Dear Detective
 Desilu Playhouse
 Dog and Cat
 Dynasty
 Eerie, Indiana 
 Eight Is Enough 
 Eischied
 Emerald Point N.A.S.
 The Equalizer
 Faerie Tale Theatre
 Falcon Crest
 The Fall Guy
 Fantasy Island
 The Far Pavilions
 Finder of Lost Loves
 Flying High
 Fortune Dane
 Frank's Place
 Fury
 Gabriel's Fire
 Glitter
 The Greatest American Hero
 Gunslinger
 Gunsmoke
 The Halls of Ivy
 Hell Town
 High Mountain Rangers
 Highway Patrol
 Highway to Heaven 
 Hill Street Blues
 Hooperman
 Hotel 
 Houston Knights
 I-Spy
 In the Heat of the Night
 The Islanders
 J.J. Starbuck
 Jake and the Fatman
 Jenny's War
 King's Crossing
 Knight Rider 
 Knots Landing 
 Lady Blue
 Lancer 
 Lassie
 Last Days of Patton
 Law & Order 
 Leg Work
 The Life and Legend of Wyatt Earp
 Little House: A New Beginning
 Little House on the Prairie 
 The Lone Ranger
 Lost in Space
 Lou Grant
 The Love Boat 
 MacGruder and Loud
 The Magical World of Disney
 Magnum, P.I. 
 Man from Atlantis
 The Man from U.N.C.L.E.
 Matlock
 Maverick
 Maya 
 Miami Vice 
 Misfits of Science
 Mission: Impossible
 Mousercise
 Mr. Horn
 Mr. Lucky
 Murder, She Wrote 
 The New Lassie
 Ohara
 The Oldest Rookie
 Our Family Honor
 Our House
 Outlaws
 Overland Trail
 P.S. I Luv U
 Palace Guard
 Paris
 The Persuaders 
 Planet of the Apes
 Quincy, M.E.
 Rage of Angels
 Remington Steele
 Renegade
 The Restless Gun
 The Rifleman
 Riptide
 The Rookies
 Sable
 Saints and Sinners
 Santa Barbara
 Scarecrow and Mrs. King
 The Shannara Chronicles 
 Sidekicks
 Silk Stalkings
 Something Is Out There
 Sonny Spoon
 Spenser: For Hire
 Spies
 St. Elsewhere
 Star Trek: The Original Series
 Starsky and Hutch
 Stingray
 Street Hawk
 Sugarfoot
 Surfside 6
 Sweet Valley High
 Tales of the Gold Monkey
 Tequila and Bonetti
 The Texan
 T. J. Hooker
 Tour of Duty
 Trapper John, M.D.
 True Blue
 Tucker's Witch
 Under Cover 
 The Untouchables
 V: The Final Battle
 Voyage to the Bottom of the Sea
 Walker Texas Ranger 
 Wagon Train
 Werewolf
 Wiseguy
 A Year in the Life
 The Young Indiana Jones Chronicles
 The Young Riders

Argentine
 Kachorra
 Lalola
 Monica Brava 
 Soy Luna 
 Aliados

Australian
 A Dangerous Life 
 Alien Surf Girls 
 H2O: Just Add Water 
 Mako Mermaids 
 Target

British
 The Champions
 Doctor Who
 Robin of Sherwood
 Street Fighter: Assassin's Fist 
 The Professionals
 The Sandbaggers
 The Sweeney
 Wolfblood

Canadian
 Adderly
 Goosebumps
 Katts and Dog
 Night Heat
 The Other Kingdom 
 Tropical Heat

Chinese
 Meteor Garden 
 Ice Fantasy 
 The Starry Night, The Starry Sea 
 Crimson Girl 
 Fighter of Destiny 
 Fire of Eternal Love 
 The Fox Fairy 
 The Legend of Zu 
 Love O2O 
 Rakshasa Street

Colombian
 Betty la Fea 
 Lola

Irish
 The Clinic

Japanese
 Chibi Maruko Chan 
 Gokusen 
 Good Luck 
 GTO Live 
 Hana Kimi 
 Hana Yori Dango 
 Hana Yori Dango 2 
 Mischievous Kiss: Love in Tokyo 
 One Liter of Tears 

Anthologies
 True Horror Stories 
 Tales of Horror 
 Midnight Horror Stories

Korean

Anthologies
 Heart of Asia Presents

Mexican
 Adriana 
 Agujetas de color de rosa
 Angela
 Azul
 Corazon Indomable 
 Good Morning, Teacher 
 La intrusa  Little Ana 
 María Belén 
 Maria del Carmen 
 Maria Jose Maria la del Barrio 
 Marimar 
 Morelia Paulina 
 Pobre Niña Rica Rosalinda 
 Salome Twin StarsPeruvian
 LuciaTaiwanese
 At Dolphin Bay 
 Fated to Love You 
 Lavender 
 Love Storm 
 Marmalade Boy 
 My MVP Valentine 
 Poor Prince 
 Snow Angel 
 Starry, Starry Night 
 Twin Sisters 
 White Book Of Love 

Venezuelan
 All My Love Cara Sucia Carita Pintada Ikaw Ug Ako 
 Samantha Taba TinaAnimated
American
 101 Dalmatians: The Series Adventures of the Gummi Bears The Adventures of Tintin Aladdin All Dogs Go to Heaven: The Series The All New Popeye Show Alvin and the Chipmunks Back to the Future: The Animated Series Batman: The Animated Series Batman: The Brave and the Bold Beast Machines: Transformers Ben 10 Benji, Zax & the Alien Prince Big Bad Beetleborgs (1997–1999)
 Biker Mice from Mars Bionic Six Bobby's World Bugs Bunny Buzz Lightyear of Star Command Captain Power and the Soldiers of the Future Centurions Chip 'n Dale Rescue Rangers Chuck Norris Karate Commandos (1986)
 Class of the Titans Cow and Chicken Darkwing Duck Dennis the Menace Dino Riders Dinosaucers Diplodos Disney Adventures 
 Doug Downtown Dragon Flyz DuckTales The Flintstones Foster's Home for Imaginary Friends 
 Fox Kids Block Gadget Boy & Heather GMA Cartoon Carnival 
 GMA Christmas Cartoon Festival Presents 
 Goof Troop He-Man and the Masters of the Universe Heathcliff Hercules Hulk Hogan's Rock 'n' Wrestling Inhumanoids 
 Inspector Gadget Jabberjaw Jackie Chan Adventures 
 Jayce and the Wheeled Warriors The Jetsons Johnny Bravo Jonny Quest Kissyfur Lazer Tag Academy The Legend of Tarzan Legion of Super Heroes 
 The Little Mermaid Looney Tunes The Looney Tunes Show 
 The Magical World of Disney M.A.S.K. Martin Mystery Merrie Melodies Mickey Mouse Works Mighty Orbots Mighty Ducks Mister T 
 My Little Pony: Friendship is Magic Mummies Alive! The New Adventures of He-Man The New Adventures of Winnie the Pooh Pac-Man and the Ghostly Adventures 
 Paddle Pop Dinoterra Paw Paws Pepper Ann The Pink Panther Pocket Dragon Adventures Popeye the Sailor 
 Pound Puppies The Powerpuff Girls 
 Quack Pack Recess Rude Dog and the Dweebs Rugrats 
 Scooby-Doo and Scrappy-Doo Scooby-Doo! Mystery Incorporated The Scooby-Doo Show Scooby-Doo, Where Are You! Sea Hunt Shaggy & Scooby-Doo Get a Clue! Shirt Tales SilverHawks 
 Skeleton Warriors Sky Commanders Sky Dancers The Smurfs Sonic the Hedgehog Space Strikers Spider-Man Spider-Man and his Amazing Friends Spiral Zone Star Trek: The Animated Series Starla and the Jewel Riders 
 Samurai Syber-Squad Terrytoons ThunderCats Tigersharks Timon and Pumbaa Tom and Jerry 
 Tom and Jerry Kids Tom and Jerry Tales 
 Voltron World's Famous Tales Yogi's Treasure Hunt Young Justice 

Australian
 Cushion KidsBritish
 Bananaman Bill and Ben Count Duckula Danger Mouse Pablo the Little Red Fox 
 Rotten Ralph 
 Thomas & Friends 

Canadian
 Captain Flamingo Martin Mystery Princess Sissi T. and T. Team Galaxy Wunsch PunchFinnish
 Angry Birds Toons with Stella and Piggy Tales 

Italian
 Puppy in My Pocket: Adventures in PocketvilleJapanese
 The Adventures of Hello Kitty & Friends Air Master Alakazam the Great Alice in Wonderland Angie Girl 
 Anne of Green Gables 
 Atashin'chi Baki the Grappler Bakugan Battle Brawlers Bakusō Kyōdai Let's & Go!! Barangay 143 Battle B-Daman Battle B-Daman: Fire Spirits Birdy the Mighty Bleach Bomberman B-Daman Bakugaiden Bubblegum Crisis: Tokyo 2040 Bush Baby Cardcaptor Sakura Candy Candy Captain Fatz 
 Cat's Eye Charlotte Mayflower Chōdenji Robo Combattler V Chousei Kantai Sazer-X Chouseishin Gransazer Chrono Crusade Cinderella Monogatari Cowboy Bebop Cyborg Kuro-chan Daimos 
 Desert Punk Detective Conan 
 Doraemon Daigunder 
 Dragon Ball 
 Dragon Ball GT Dragon Ball Kai Dragon Ball Z Emily of New Moon Fairy Tail Flame of Recca Flint the Time Detective The Flying House Full Metal Panic! Full Metal Panic? Fumoffu Fullmetal Alchemist Final Fantasy: Unlimited 
 Fusen Shojo Temple-Chan 
 Fushigi Yuugi G Gundam Gaist Crusher Ghost in the Shell GranDoll Grendizer Grimm's Fairy Tales GTO 
 Gundam Wing Gundam X Gundam 00 
 Gyrozetter 
 Hamtaro Happy Tales Gadget Boy 
 Hayate the Combat Butler!! Heidi, Girl of the Alps Hell Teacher Nūbē Hello Anne: Before Green Gables Hungry Heart Wild Striker 
 Hunter × Hunter Hyper Speed GranDoll Ie Naki Ko 
 Initial D The First Stage Initial D The Fourth Stage Initial D The Second Stage InuYasha Invincible Teacher 
 Jewelpet Jiban Jungle Book Justirisers Juuni Kokki Kaiketsu Zorori 
 Kamen Rider 555 
 Kamen Rider OOO 
 Katri, Ang Patang Pastol Kekkaishi King of Warriors Knight Hunters Knockout Knockout: New Challenger Love Hina Lucy of the Southern Rainbow 
 Lupin III 
 Machine Robo Rescue Macron 1 Madan Senki Ryukendo Majin Bone Magi: The Labyrinth of Magic Magic Kaito Magic Knight Rayearth Magical Do-re-mi Marco Marmalade Boy Master Hamsters Master Mosquiton '99 
 Mazinger Z Mechander Robo 
 Medabots Mix Master Mobile Suit Gundam Wing 
 Mojacko 
 Mon Colle Knights Monster Rancher Monsuno 
 Mushiking: King of the Beetles My Annette Mysterious Joker 
 Nadja Ninja Robots Oh! My Goddess One Piece Oreca Battle Outlaw Star Perrine Pet Shop of Horrors Pokémon 
 Pollyanna Powerpuff Girls Z 
 Pretty Cure Prince of Tennis Princess Knight 
 Ranma ½ Robotech Rockman EXE Rockman EXE Access Rockman EXE Stream Rune Soldier Saint Seiya 
 Saiyuki 
 Samurai Pizza Cats Scan2Go SD Gundam Force Shaider 
 Shaman King Shamanic Princess Shōnen Onmyōji Slam Dunk The Slayers Sorcerer Hunters Sonic X Street Fighter II V Sunny Pig Superbook Super Yo-Yo Takoyaki Mantleman Tamagotchi! Tenjho Tenge Toriko Trigun Turboranger Tank Knights Fortress 
 Ultraman Dyna 
 Ultraman Ginga 
 Ultraman Nexus 
 Ultraman Tiga 
 Ultraman R/B  
 Ultraman Taiga 
 Ultraman Z 
 Urusei Yatsura Virtua Fighter Vision of Escaflowne 
 Voltes V 
 Wakakusa no Charlotte 
 Wataru Winspector Transformers: Armada 
 Wizard of Oz 
 World Masterpiece Theater Anne of Green Gables 
 Bush Baby Heidi, Girl of the Alps Hello Anne: Before Green Gables Katri, Ang Patang Pastol Lucy of the Southern Rainbow 
 Marco My Annette Perrine Pollyanna Yawara! A Fashionable Judo Girl 
 Yokai Watch YuYu Hakusho 
 Zoids: Chaotic Century 
 Zoids: Guardian Force Zoids: New Century ZeroKorean
 Larva Pororo the Little Penguin Tobot 

Variety
 The Brady Bunch Hour Dance Fever Donny & Marie 
 The Hollywood Palace The Muppet Show Solid GoldComedy
American
 9 to 5 
 227 
 ALF 
 All in the Family Amen 
 The Ann Sothern Show B. J. and the Bear Baby Boom Barney Miller Benson 
 Best of the West Beverly Hills Buntz Blossom 
 The Brady Bunch Chico and the Man 
 The Cosby Show 
 Dave's World Dear John A Different World Diff'rent Strokes 
 Dinosaurs Empty Nest The Facts of Life 
 Family Ties 
 The Flying Nun The Fresh Prince of Bel Air 
 The Gale Storm Show Gilligan's Island Going Bananas The Golden Girls 
 Good Morning Miss Bliss Growing Pains Hardball Hardy Boys/Nancy Drew Mysteries Harrigan and Son Highway To Heaven (1993)
 Home Improvement 
 Jackass The Last Precinct Lenny Life's Most Embarrassing Moments Love American Style Major Dad 
 Mama's Boy The Mary Tyler Moore Show 
 Married... with Children M*A*S*H 
 McHale's Navy Mork & Mindy 
 My Two Dads Newhart Night Court Please Don't Eat the Daisies Punky Brewster Raising Miranda Saved by the Bell 
 Silver Spoons Small Wonder 
 Soap Taxi 
 That's My Mama The Three Stooges Three's Company 
 Three's a Crowd Top 20 Funniest 
 Who's the Boss 
 The Wonder Years 

Australian
 The Curiosity ShowBritish
 Sorry, I've Got No HeadCanadian
 Check It Out! Second City Television Just for LaughsGerman
 The Hallo Spencer ShowReality
 American Idol 
 Most Daring Survivor: Tocantins 
 That's Incredible 

Game
 Personality Play the PercentagesDocumentary / magazine
 60 Minutes Ancient Aliens 
 Big History 
 The Blue Planet 
 Earthflight 
 Frozen Planet 
 Full Force Nature 
 How the Earth Was Made 
 Human Planet 
 Man vs. Beast 
 Planet Earth 
 Serial Killer Earth 
 Stan Lee's Superhumans 
 That's HollywoodInformative
Educational
 Sesame StreetAnimated
 The Berenstain Bears Budgie the Little Helicopter Dora the Explorer 
 Dragon Tales George Shrinks Make Way For Noddy PB&J OtterLive-action
 Air Power Blue's Clues 
 Elmo's World Kidsongs 
 The Magic Land of Allakazam Pappyland Read-A-Lee Sesame Street 
 Teletubbies 
 Training You to Train Your DogReligious
 In Touch with Charles Stanley 
 The 700 Club 

Sports
 ABAP - GMA Go For Gold 
 The American Sportsman GMA Knockout Sundays 
 GMA Sports Special 
 MICAA on GMA 
 NBA Action 
 NBA Inside Stuff 
 NBA on GMA 
 The Racing Game RollerGames Scholastic Sports Academy 
 SportsCenter''

See also
 List of GMA Network specials aired
 List of Philippine television shows

References

External links
 

GMA Network
Lists of television series by network
Philippine television-related lists